The Pittsburgh Panthers baseball team is a baseball team that represents the University of Pittsburgh in the 2022 NCAA Division I baseball season. The Panthers are members of the Atlantic Coast Conference in the Coastal Division and play their home games at Charles L. Cost Field in Pittsburgh, Pennsylvania. They are led by fourth-year head coach Mike Bell.

Previous season
The Panthers finished the 2021 NCAA Division I baseball season 23–20 overall (16–17 conference) and tied for fifth place in Coastal Division standings. Following the conclusion of the regular season, the Panthers were selected to play in the 2021 ACC Tournament. The Panthers would eventually lose in Pool Play 0–2 to NC State Wolfpack.

Roster

Schedule

! style="" | Regular Season
|- valign="top"

|- align="center" bgcolor="#ffcccc"
| 1 || February 18 || || vs  || Centennial Park • Port Charlotte, Florida || 3–11 || Duffy (1–0) || Gilbertson (0–1) || None || 333 || 0–1 || –
|- align="center" bgcolor="#ccffcc"
| 2 || February 19 || || vs Canisius || Centennial Park • Port Charlotte, Florida || 12–2 || Corcoran (1–0) || Abbott (0–1) || None || 222 || 1–1 || –
|- align="center" bgcolor="#ccffcc"
| 3 || February 19 || || vs Canisius || Centennial Park • Port Charlotte, Florida || 4–0 || Evans (1–0) || Duffy (0–1) || Summers (1) || 227 || 2–1 || –
|- align="center" bgcolor="#ffcccc"
| 4 || February 20 || || vs Canisius || Centennial Park • Port Charlotte, Florida || 7–15 || Consigli (1–0) || Dragani (0–1) || None || 249 || 2–2 || –
|- align="center" bgcolor="#ccffcc"
| 5 || February 25 || || vs  || Dugan Field • Nashville, Tennessee || 4–3 || Gilbertson (1–1) || Jausel (0–1) || Summers (2) || 197 || 3–2 || –
|- align="center" bgcolor="#ffcccc"
| 6 || February 26 || || vs Bradley || Dugan Field • Nashville, Tennessee || 2–3 || Kisting (0–1) || Corcoran (1–1) || Catton (1) || 107 || 3–3 || –
|- align="center" bgcolor="#ccffcc"
| 7 || February 26 || || at  || Dugan Field • Nashville, Tennessee || 16–0 || Evans (2–0) || Van Treeck (0–1) || None || 127 || 4–3 || –
|- align="center" bgcolor="#ccffcc"
| 8 || February 27 || || at Lipscomb || Dugan Field • Nashville, Tennessee || 6–5 || Stuart (1–0) || Cheatwood (0–1) || None || 257 || 5–3 || – 
|-

|- align="center" bgcolor="#ffcccc"
| 9 || March 4 || || vs  || Segra Stadium • Fayetteville, North Carolina || 3–5 || Dennehy (1–1) || Stuart (1–1) || Gresham (1) || 459 || 5–4 || –
|- align="center" bgcolor="#ccffcc"
| 10 || March 5 || || vs  || Segra Stadium • Fayetteville, North Carolina || 6–5 || Summers (1–0) || Brock (0–1) || None || 689 || 6–4 || –
|- align="center" bgcolor="#ccffcc"
| 11 || March 6 || || vs Campbell || Segra Stadium • Fayetteville, North Carolina || 11–5 || Corcoran (2–1) || Rund (0–1) || None || – || 7–4 || –
|- align="center" bgcolor="#ccffcc"
| 12 || March 9 || || at  || Williard Stadium • High Point, North Carolina || 15–5 || Dragani (1–1) || Viar (0–1) || None || 404 || 8–4 || –
|- align="center" bgcolor="#ffcccc"
| 13 || March 11 || || at No. 15 North Carolina || Boshamer Stadium • Chapel Hill, North Carolina || 4–7 || Mott (3–0) || Gilbertson (1–2) || O'Brien (3) || – || 8–5 || 0–1
|- align="center" bgcolor="#ffcccc"
| 14 || March 12 || || at No. 15 North Carolina || Boshamer Stadium • Chapel Hill, North Carolina || 3–4 || Peavyhouse (1–1) || Summers (1–1) || None || 1,645 || 8–6 || 0–2
|- align="center" bgcolor="#ffcccc"
| 15 || March 13 || || at No. 15 North Carolina || Boshamer Stadium • Chapel Hill, North Carolina || 2–9 || Mott (4–0) || Stuart (1–2) || Rapp (1) || 1,637 || 8–7 || 0–3
|- align="center" bgcolor="#ccffcc"
| 16 || March 15 || ||  || Charles L. Cost Field • Pittsburgh, Pennsylvania || 21–6 || Devereux (1–0) || Magovern (0–2) || None || 411 || 9–7 || 0–3
|- align="center" bgcolor="#ffcccc"
| 17 || March 16 || || Youngstown State || Charles L. Cost Field • Pittsburgh, Pennsylvania || 2–5 || Mikos (2–0) || Miller (0–1) || None || 240 || 9–8 || 0–3
|- align="center" bgcolor="#ccffcc"
| 18 || March 18 || || at Virginia Tech || English Field • Blacksburg, Virginia || 4–3 || Gilbertson (2–2) || Hurney (1–1) || Stuart (3) || 461 || 10–8 || 1–3
|- align="center" bgcolor="#ffcccc"
| 19 || March 19 || || at Virginia Tech || English Field • Blacksburg, Virginia || 6–22 || Hackenberg (4–0) || Evans (2–1) || None || 1,391 || 10–9 || 1–4
|- align="center" bgcolor="#ffcccc"
| 20 || March 20 || || at Virginia Tech || English Field • Blacksburg, Virginia || 1–7 || Weycker (3–0) || Corcoran (2–2) || None || 574 || 10–10 || 1–5
|- align="center" bgcolor="#cccccc"
| 21 || March 23 || ||  || Charles L. Cost Field • Pittsburgh, Pennsylvania || colspan=7 | Postponed
|- align="center" bgcolor="#ccffcc"
| 22 || March 25 || || Clemson || Charles L. Cost Field • Pittsburgh, Pennsylvania || 8–0 || Gilbertson (3–2) || Anglin (3–2) || None || rowspan=2| 776 || 11–10 || 2–5
|- align="center" bgcolor="#ccffcc"
| 23 || March 25 || || Clemson || Charles L. Cost Field • Pittsburgh, Pennsylvania || 10–7 || Evans (3–1) || Hoffmann (3–2) || Stuart (2) || 12–10 || 3–5
|- align="center" bgcolor="#cccccc"
| 24 || March 27 || || Clemson || Charles L. Cost Field • Pittsburgh, Pennsylvania || colspan=7 | Canceled
|- align="center" bgcolor="#cccccc"
| 25 || March 29 || || at  || Medlar Field • University Park, Pennsylvania || colspan=7 | Postponed
|- align="center" bgcolor="#ccffcc"
| 26 || March 21 || || West Virginia || Charles L. Cost Field • Pittsburgh, Pennsylvania || 9–6 || Devereux (2–0) || Sleeper (1–4) || Stuart (3) || 340 || 13–10 || 3–5
|-

|- align="center" bgcolor="#ccffcc"
| 27 || April 1 || || No. 5  || Charles L. Cost Field • Pittsburgh, Pennsylvania || 8–7 || Gilberton (4–2) || Kuehner (4–1) || None || 467 || 14–10 || 4–5
|- align="center" bgcolor="#ffcccc"
| 28 || April 2 || || No. 5 Louisville || Charles L. Cost Field • Pittsburgh, Pennsylvania || 6–14 || Poland (2–1) || Evans (3–2) || None || 489 || 14–11 || 4–6
|- align="center" bgcolor="#ccffcc"
| 29 || April 3 || || No. 5 Louisville || Charles L. Cost Field • Pittsburgh, Pennsylvania || 3–2 || Corcoran (3–2) || Phillips (3–1) || None || 360 || 15–11 || 5–6
|- align="center" bgcolor="#ccffcc"
| 30 || April 6 || || at Youngstown State || Eastwood Field • Niles, Ohio || 9–1 || Devereux (3–0) || Perez (1–3) || None || 165 || 16–11 || 5–6
|- align="center" bgcolor="#ccffcc"
| 31 || April 8 || || at  || Eddie Pellagrini Diamond • Brighton, Massachusetts || 13–3 || Gilbertson (5–2) || Mancini (2–2) || None || 313 || 17–11 || 6–6
|- align="center" bgcolor="#ffcccc"
| 32 || April 9 || || at Boston College || Eddie Pellagrini Diamond • Brighton, Massachusetts || 8–9 || Ryan (2–2) || Evans (3–3) || Coffey (3) || 289 || 17–12 || 6–7
|- align="center" bgcolor="#ccffcc"
| 33 || April 10 || || at Boston College || Eddie Pellagrini Diamond • Brighton, Massachusetts || 10–9 || Corcoran (4–2) || Pelio (1–3) || Stuart (4) || 408 || 18–12 || 7–7
|- align="center" bgcolor="#ccffcc"
| 34 || April 12 || || at Kent State || Schoonover Stadium • Kent, Ohio || 12–5 || Dragani (2–1) || Rocco (0–1) || None || 663 || 19–12 || 7–7
|- align="center" bgcolor="#ccffcc"
| 35 || April 15 || || No. 8 Virginia || Charles L. Cost Field • Pittsburgh, Pennsylvania || W 9–4 || Gilbertson (6–2) || Savino (4–3) || None || 632 || 20–12 || 8–7
|- align="center" bgcolor="#ffcccc"
| 36 || April 16 || || No. 8 Virginia || Charles L. Cost Field • Pittsburgh, Pennsylvania || L 0–18 || Gursky (6–0) || Evans (3–4) || None || 608 || 20–13 || 8–8
|- align="center" bgcolor="#ccffcc"
| 37 || April 17 || || No. 8 Virginia || Charles L. Cost Field • Pittsburgh, Pennsylvania || W 4–1 || Corcoran (5–2) || Berry (4–3) || Stuart (5) || 398 || 21–13 || 9–8
|- align="center" bgcolor="#ffcccc"
| 38 || April 20 || || vs West Virginia || PNC Park • Pittsburgh, Pennsylvania || L 2–3 || Abernathy (1–0) || Devereux (3–1) || None || 861 || 21–14 || 9–8
|- align="center" bgcolor="#ffcccc"
| 39 || April 22 || || at No. 5 Miami (FL) || Alex Rodriguez Park at Mark Light Field • Coral Gables, Florida || L 1–2 (10) || Arguelles (2–0) || Stuart (1–3) || None || 3,409 || 21–15 || 9–9
|- align="center" bgcolor="#ffcccc"
| 40 || April 23 || || at No. 5 Miami (FL) || Alex Rodriguez Park at Mark Light Field • Coral Gables, Florida || L 2–17 || Ligon (5–2) || Evans (3–5) || None || 3,288 || 21–16 || 9–10
|- align="center" bgcolor="#ccffcc"
| 41 || April 24 || || at No. 5 Miami (FL) || Alex Rodriguez Park at Mark Light Field • Coral Gables, Florida || W 9–4 || Corcoran (6–2) || Rosario (1–2) || None || 3,299 || 22–16 || 10–10
|- align="center" bgcolor="#ccffcc"
| 42 || April 29 || ||  || Charles L. Cost Field • Pittsburgh, Pennsylvania || W 10–0 || Gilbertson (7–2) || Winebarger (2–6) || None || 277 || 23–16 || 10–10
|- align="center" bgcolor="#ffcccc"
| 43 || April 30 || || North Carolina A&T || Charles L. Cost Field • Pittsburgh, Pennsylvania || L 5–9 || Fields (1–1) || Corcoran (6–3) || None || 316 || 23–17 || 10–10
|- align="center" bgcolor="#ccffcc"
| 44 || April 30 || || North Carolina A&T || Charles L. Cost Field • Pittsburgh, Pennsylvania || W 13–9 || Devereux (4–1) || Thomas (1–1) || None || 317 || 24–17 || 10–10
|-

|- align="center" bgcolor="#cccccc"
| 45 || May 3 || ||  || Charles L. Cost Field • Pittsburgh, Pennsylvania || colspan=7 | Canceled
|- align="center" bgcolor="#ffcccc"
| 46 || May 4 || || Oakland || Charles L. Cost Field • Pittsburgh, Pennsylvania || L 4–8 || Pidek (2–1) || Devereux (4–2) || Kujawa (1) || 263 || 24–18 || 10–10
|- align="center" bgcolor="#ccffcc"
| 47 || May 7 || ||  || Charles L. Cost Field • Pittsburgh, Pennsylvania || W 14–4 || Gilbertson (8–2) || Santucci (2–2) || None || 467 || 25–18 || 11–10
|- align="center" bgcolor="#ccffcc"
| 48 || May 8 || || Duke || Charles L. Cost Field • Pittsburgh, Pennsylvania || W 3–2 || Corcoran (7–3) || Stinson (4–1) || Stuart (6) || 336 || 26–18 || 12–10
|- align="center" bgcolor="#ffcccc"
| 49 || May 8 || || Duke || Charles L. Cost Field • Pittsburgh, Pennsylvania || L 5–15 || Fox (3–5) || Evans (3–6) || None || 559 || 26–19 || 12–11
|- align="center" bgcolor="#ffcccc"
| 50 || May 10 || || at West Virginia || Monongalia County Ballpark • Morgantown, West Virginia || L 1–9 || Major (2–0) || Bautista (0–1) || None || 3,169 || 26–20 || 12–11
|- align="center" bgcolor="#ffcccc"
| 51 || May 13 || || at No. 16  || Frank Eck Stadium • Notre Dame, Indiana || L 3–8 || Bertrand (7–1) || Gilbertson (8–3) || None || 896 || 26–21 || 12–12
|- align="center" bgcolor="#ffcccc"
| 52 || May 14 || || at No. 16 Notre Dame || Frank Eck Stadium • Notre Dame, Indiana || L 1–8 || Mercer (1–1) || Corcoran (7–4) || None || 647 || 26–22 || 12–13
|- align="center" bgcolor="#ccffcc"
| 53 || May 15 || || at No. 16 Notre Dame || Frank Eck Stadium • Notre Dame, Indiana || W 5–2 || Evans (4–6) || Findlay (5–1) || Stuart (7) || 649 || 27–22 || 13–13
|- align="center" bgcolor="#ffcccc"
| 54 || May 17 || || vs Penn State || PNC Park • Pittsburgh, Pennsylvania || L 9–16 || Kohls (2–0) || Demi (0–1) || None || 2,582 || 27–23 || 13–13
|- align="center" bgcolor="#ffcccc"
| 55 || May 19 || ||  || Charles L. Cost Field • Pittsburgh, Pennsylvania || L 7–8 || Maxwell (1–0) || Stuart (1–4) || None || 368 || 27–24 || 13–14
|- align="center" bgcolor="#ffcccc"
| 56 || May 20 || || Georgia Tech || Charles L. Cost Field • Pittsburgh, Pennsylvania ||  L 3–19 || Grissom, Jr. (3–5) || Corcoran (7–5) || None || 391 || 27–25 || 13–15
|- align="center" bgcolor="#ffcccc"
| 57 || May 21 || || Georgia Tech || Charles L. Cost Field • Pittsburgh, Pennsylvania || L 7–13 || Brown (3–1)|| Evans (4–7) || Maxwell (4) || 434 || 27–26 || 13–16

|-
! style="" | Postseason
|-

|- align="center" bgcolor="#ccffcc"
| 58 || May 24 ||  || Georgia Tech || Truist Field • Charlotte, NC || W 12–6 || Gilberston (9–3) || Crawford (0–1) || Bautista (1) || 1,895 || 28–26 || 1–0
|- align="center" bgcolor="#ccffcc"
| 59 || May 25 ||  || No. 7 Louisville || Truist Field • Charlotte, NC || W 6–5 || Stuart (2–4) || Poland (5–4) || None || 2,141 || 29–26 || 2–0
|- align="center" bgcolor="#ffcccc"
| 60 || May 28 ||  ||  || Truist Field • Charlotte, NC || L 3–8 || Silver (8–1) || Evans (4–8) || None || 8,360 || 29–27 || 2–1

|}

References

Pittsburgh
Pittsburgh Panthers baseball seasons
Pittsburgh